The Lewisville Lake Toll Bridge (LLTB) is a 1.7 mile (2.7 km) tied arch bridge crossing Lewisville Lake in Denton County, Texas, USA. The North Texas Tollway Authority (NTTA) worked cooperatively with Denton County to plan and design a toll bridge across the northwestern arm of Lewisville Lake. The four-lane toll bridge connects Swisher Road in Lake Dallas to Eldorado Parkway in Little Elm, Texas.  The Lewisville Lake Corridor is approximately 13.8 miles long and is divided into eight sections constructed by Denton County, NTTA, TxDOT, Little Elm, and Frisco, Texas.  The bridge is the second longest bridge in the North Texas area, behind the Texas State Highway 66 bridge over Lake Ray Hubbard between Rowlett and Rockwall approximately 30 miles to the southeast.

Motorists in the fastest growing areas of Denton County and the Dallas–Fort Worth metroplex are able to travel on a new connection between Interstate 35E and the Dallas North Tollway, eliminating the circuitous (and highly congested) routes currently required around Lewisville Lake (though it now funnels traffic onto I-35E north of the bridge over Lewisville Lake, which itself is a notorious bottleneck). The conceptual design of the project entailed eight sections that, together, total . Only the  bridge over the lake is tolled. The surfaces of this section are lighted with LEDs at night to make the structure visible from the surrounding shores of the lake.

The project opened to vehicular traffic on August 1, 2009, after a charity run and walk across the bridge.  The NTTA stated that occasion was the only time pedestrians will ever be allowed to cross the bridge.  The NTTA funded and constructed the toll bridge while the cities along the corridor, Denton County and Texas Department of Transportation (TxDOT) funded improvements to the roadways approaching the bridge.  The NTTA toll across the bridge section is $1.32 for TollTag customers and $1.98 for ZipCash drivers.

History 
A bridge previously connected Little Elm and Lake Dallas, but was removed in the 1950s when the United States Army Corps of Engineers expanded Lewisville Lake.  The old bridge provided a vital transportation link between Lake Dallas and Little Elm.

Project Costs 
Project Cost Estimate: $220 million (entire corridor)
Estimated NTTA Cost: $122 million (toll bridge only)

Key Dates 

May 2005 - The NTTA Board of Directors selected a preliminary design of the bridge, which features a distinctive tied arch spanning  at the center with approaches and thresholds flanked by pairs of lighted columns.
Late 2005 - A Finding of No Significant Impact (FONSI) for the Environmental Impact Assessment is received
Early 2006 - Completion of plans, specifications and estimates on the toll bridge and public hearings for sections 4-6 and 8. Design for sections 4-6 initiated.
Spring 2006 - Denton County broke ground on Section 1, west of the bridge, and construction is under way.
Summer 2006 - Construction on Section 3, the eastern approach to the bridge, is planned to begin in late summer 2006.
January 2007 - Groundbreaking for the bridge was held in Denton County on January 31, 2007
May 2007 - Crews have built and placed many of the rebar frames for the support columns on the west bank and will soon begin pouring concrete into them.
May 2008 - Construction of the bridge reached the halfway point.
January 2009 - All four corner pieces of the arch structure are in place.
April 2009 - The last major rib arch piece was installed.  Construction is approximately 90% complete.
August 1, 2009 - Charity run and walk across bridge.  Bridge opens to vehicular traffic.
February 28, 2010 - Last portions of the construction work are completed, including work on the arch lighting.

See also
Denton County, Texas
Frisco, Texas
Lake Dallas, Texas
Little Elm, Texas

References

External links
North Texas Tollway Authority

Map and Images 
Detailed Map (PDF): A detailed map of the whole project is available as a PDF from the Denton County Commissioner's page.
High-resolution Rendering: A high resolution rendering of the bridge's "gateway" span is available from the Denton County Commissioner's page.

Bridges completed in 2009
Toll bridges in Texas
Buildings and structures in Denton County, Texas
Tied arch bridges in the United States
Transportation in Denton County, Texas
Road bridges in Texas
Concrete bridges in the United States
Trestle bridges in the United States